Hemiphyllodactylus kolliensis is a species of gecko. It is endemic to Tamil Nadu, India.

References

Hemiphyllodactylus
Reptiles described in 2019
Endemic fauna of India
Reptiles of India